Jonathan Dickinson Sergeant (1746 – October 8, 1793) was an American lawyer from Princeton, New Jersey. He represented New Jersey in the Second Continental Congress in 1776 and 1777. He later served as Attorney General for the state of Pennsylvania.

Life and career
Sergeant was born in 1746 in Newark, New Jersey, the son of Abigail (Dickinson) and Jonathan Sergeant. He moved with his parents to Princeton. He completed his initial studies and attended the College of New Jersey (now Princeton University), receiving his degree in 1762. His maternal grandfather, Jonathan Dickinson, had been the first president of the college at its founding in 1747. After Sergeant's graduation from the College of Philadelphia (now the University of Pennsylvania) in 1763 with an A.B. degree, he read for the law and entered practice in Princeton in 1767.

From 1774 to 1776 he was a member of the revolutionary New Jersey Provincial Congress. In early 1776 he went as a delegate to the Continental Congress, but he resigned in June to return home and serve on the committee that drafted New Jersey's first constitution. In November he returned again to the national congress.

In September 1777 he resigned from Congress a second time, this time to accept office as the attorney general of Pennsylvania. He permanently moved to Philadelphia and opened a law practice there on his return to private life in 1780. In 1784, he was elected a member of the American Philosophical Society.

Sergeant died in Philadelphia in 1793 and was originally buried in the Old Presbyterian Churchyard at Fourth and Pine Streets. In 1878, he was re-interred in the Laurel Hill Cemetery.

His son John Sergeant later represented Pennsylvania in the U.S. Congress.  Another son, Thomas Sergeant, served as Pennsylvania secretary of state, attorney general and on the state Supreme Court.

References

1746 births
1793 deaths
People of colonial New Jersey
Politicians from Newark, New Jersey
Lawyers from Philadelphia
People from Princeton, New Jersey
Princeton University alumni
University of Pennsylvania alumni
Continental Congressmen from New Jersey
18th-century American politicians
New Jersey lawyers
Pennsylvania lawyers
Burials at Laurel Hill Cemetery (Philadelphia)
Lawyers from Newark, New Jersey